Frank Stanley Booth (12 February 1907 – 21 January 1980) was an English cricketer who played first-class cricket for Lancashire between 1927 and 1937. Predominantly a fast bowler he took 457 wickets for the club including 101 during the 1934 English season in which the county won the County Championship.

References

External links
CricketArchive Profile
Wisden obituary

1907 births
1980 deaths
Cricketers from Manchester
Lancashire cricketers
English cricketers
People from Cheetham Hill
Durham cricketers